Dave Sturt (born 1960, Middlesbrough, England) is an English bassist and record producer.

Musical career
Sturt began playing bass guitar and recording at the age of 17. In 1982 he moved to London and soon broke into the session scene working alongside film composer Michael Kamen, Pink Floyd guitarist David Gilmour, Roxy Music drummer Andy Newmark, and David Bowie sideman Earl Slick amongst others. In 1987 Sturt joined Jade Warrior, recording three albums as bass player, composer and co-producer alongside Tom Newman (Tubular Bells). He went on to compose themes and incidental music for film and television as well as playing sessions for Pol Brennan (Clannad), BeatsystemUK (on Myspace) and Theo Travis.
Live work developed with Cuban/American guitarist Isaac Guillory, Thee na Shee, The Fraser Sisters, Andy Sheppard, Bosco D’Olivera and Bill Nelson. 
Sturt performed for many years with Theo Travis in Cipher, producing three albums and several scores to silent films. Prior to Cipher, the pair had worked together in the four-piece jazz fusion band The Other Side, releasing the album Dangerous Days in 1994.

During 2009 and 2010, Sturt toured Europe playing bass for both Gong and Steve Hillage. In 2011 he played bass with Bill Nelson on the Classic Rock Legends live DVD.

2012 has seen Sturt composing soundtracks for 'Ben Rushgrove - a documentary' for Channel 4 and for 'Past Lives' - (along with Theo Travis) - a touring live performance with archive footage from The Media Archive for Central England. He is also touring Europe, the UK and Japan with Gong

2013 saw more live work with Gong in Brazil and the development of the Past Lives Project - a cinefilm and music project funded by Arts Council England and Heritage Lottery Fund.
There were more performances with Gong in 2014 in Brazil, France and the UK and also the Gong album ‘I See You’ was released - with Sturt as bass player, co-composer and co-producer.

Sturt's first solo album 'Dreams & Absurdities' was released in 2015 featuring guest appearances from Daevid Allen, Jon Field, Fabio Golfetti, Steve Hillage, Bill Nelson (musician), Kavus Torabi and Theo Travis. It was engineered and mixed by Sturt and mastered by Andy Jackson.

In 2015-16 he again toured with Gong around the UK and in Norway and began work on composing the first Gong album since Daevid Allen's death.  The album Rejoice! I'm Dead! was released in 2016 - with Sturt as bass player, co-composer and 'overseer and gatekeeper'.

He is an endorsee of Vigier basses and Markbass amplification.

Discography

Albums
 Weightless mini-album (2012) limited, self-made edition of 30 copies
  (2015) Esoteric/Antenna

Collaboration albums
Breathing the Storm (1992)  [] 
 (1993) [] 
Dangerous Days (1994) [The Other Side]
 (1996) [] 
Stereo (1996) [] Chronoscope Records
 (1999) [] 
 (1997) [] Triskell 
Strange Horse (1999) [] 
Obvious (2000) [Obvious]  Tube
Going Around (2001) [] No Masters
 (2002) [Cipher] Gliss
 (2005) [Cipher] 
Nottingham Songs (2006) []
NOW (2008) [] 
I See You (2014) [] Madfish
Rejoice! I'm Dead! (2016) [] Madfish

Collaboration albums as mix engineer
Discretion (2014) [] Panegyric

Tracks on collaboration albums
"This World" on The Dream Academy (1985) [] uncredited

Collaboration singles
"Easy" / "Holding Out" (1981) [Moulin Rouge] Teesbeat Records
"Goodbye Scarlet" 12" (1987) [Sara Davis] September
"Walk on the Wild Side" (1988) [Beatsystem] 4th & Broadway

Collaboration DVDs
  (2011) [] ITV Studios Home Entertainment

Tracks on compilation albums
"White Cloud, Blue Sky" [Cipher] and "Boundless Sky" [Thee-na-Shee] on The Sky Goes All the Way Home (1999) [Various] Voiceprint

References

External links
Dave Sturt official website
Gong official website
Jade Warrior official website
Cipher

Alumni of Middlesex University
Ambient musicians
English bass guitarists
English male guitarists
English record producers
Male bass guitarists
Living people
1960 births
Gong (band) members
Progressive rock bass guitarists